Challenges is a French-language weekly business magazine headquartered in Paris, France. Its motto is Que dit l'économie cette semaine? ("What does the economy say this week?" in English).

History and profile
Challenges was established in 1982. The magazine offers articles on economy and business-related events and on politics and world affairs. It is published weekly on Thursdays. Previously it was published monthly and then biweekly.

Le Nouvel Observateur Group is the owner and publisher of Challenges. The company also owns Le Nouvel Observateur. Former publisher of Challenges was  Croque Futur. The magazine is published by Regie OBS.

Challenges was named as the Business Magazine of the Year in France in 2010.

Circulation
In 2001 Challenges had a circulation of 264,000 copies. The circulation of the magazine was 260,020 copies in 2008. It fell to 250,065 copies in 2009 and 232,000 copies in 2010. During the period of 2011-2012 its circulation was 232,430 copies. The circulation of the magazine was 183,233 copies in 2020.

References

External links
 Official website

1982 establishments in France
Biweekly magazines published in France
Business magazines published in France
French-language magazines
Magazines established in 1982
Magazines published in Paris
Monthly magazines published in France
Weekly magazines published in France